Alex or Alexander Moore may refer to:

Alex Moore (dancer) (1901–1991), pioneer of modern ballroom dancing
Alex Moore (footballer) (1918–1989), Australian footballer for Collingwood
Alex Moore (rugby union) (born 1963), Scottish rugby player
Alex Moore (wrestler) (born 1997), Canadian amateur wrestler 
Alex Moore (American football) (born 1945), American football player
Alexander Pollock Moore (1867–1930), American diplomat, editor and publisher
Alexander Moore (politician) (1874–1952), Member of the Legislative Assembly of Alberta, 1919–1926
Whistlin' Alex Moore (1899–1989), American blues pianist
Alex Moore, singer/songwriter, lead guitarist for The Lathums